Abdur Rahman Khan GCSI (between 1840 and 1844 – 1 October 1901) was Amir of Afghanistan from 1880 to his death in 1901. He is known for uniting the country after years of internal fighting and negotiation of the Durand Line Agreement with British India.

Abdur Rahman Khan was the first child and only son of Mohammad Afzal Khan, and grandson of Dost Mohammad Khan, founder of the Barakzai dynasty. Abdur Rahman Khan re-established the writ of the Afghan government after the disarray that followed the second Anglo-Afghan war. He became known as The Iron Amir because his government was a military despotism. This despotism rested upon a well-appointed army and was administered through officials subservient to an inflexible will and controlled by a widespread system of espionage.

The nickname, The Iron Amir, is also associated due to his victory over a number of rebellions by various tribes who were led by his relatives. One source says that during his reign there were over 40 rebellions throughout his rule. Abdur Rahman Khan's rule was termed by one British official as a "reign of terror", as he was absolutely despotic and had up to 100,000 people judicially executed during his 21 years as Emir. Thousands more starved to death, caught deadly diseases and died, were massacred by his army, or were killed during his forceful migrations of tribes. However, he was perhaps the greatest military genius Afghanistan ever produced.

Early life
Abdul Rahman Khan was born in Kabul in 1844. He spent most of his youth in Balkh with his father, Mohammad Afzal Khan. Abdul Rahman learned conventional warfare tactics from the Anglo-Indian soldier William Campbell.

Background and early career
Before his death in Herat, on 9 June 1863, Abdur Rahman's grandfather, Dost Mohammad Khan, nominated his third son, Sher Ali Khan, as his successor, passing over the two elder brothers, Afzal Khan and Azam Khan. At first, the new Amir was quietly recognized. But after a few months, Afzal Khan raised an insurrection in the north of the country, where he had been governing when his father died.  This began a fierce internecine conflict for power between Dost Mohammad's sons, which lasted for nearly five years. The Musahiban are descendants of Dost Mohammad Khan's older brother, Sultan Mohammad Khan.

Described by the American scholar and explorer Eugene Schuyler as "a tall well-built man, with a large head, and a marked Afghan, almost Jewish, face", Abdur Rahman distinguished himself for his ability and energetic daring. Although his father, Afzal Khan came to terms with Amir Sher Ali, Abdur's behavior in the northern province soon excited Amir's suspicion and, when he was summoned to Kabul, fled across the Oxus into Bukhara. Sher Ali threw Afzal Khan into prison, and a revolt followed in southern Afghanistan.

The Amir had scarcely suppressed it by winning a desperate battle when Abdur Rahman's reappearance in the north was a signal for a mutiny by troops stationed in those parts and a gathering of armed bands to his standard. After some delay and desultory fighting, he and his uncle, Azam Khan, occupied Kabul in March 1866.  The Amir Sher Ali marched up against them from Kandahar; but in the battle that ensued at Sheikhabad on 10 May, he was deserted by a large body of his troops, and after his signal defeat Abdur Rahman released his father, Afzal Khan, from prison in Ghazni, and installed him upon the throne as Amir of Afghanistan.  Notwithstanding the new Amir's incapacity, and some jealousy between the real leaders, Abdur Rahman and his uncle, they again routed Sher Ali's forces and occupied Kandahar in 1867. When Afzal Khan died at the end of the year, Azam Khan became the new ruler, with Abdur Rahman installed as governor in the northern province. But towards the end of 1868, Sher Ali's return and a general rising in his favor resulted in Abdur Rahman and Azam Khan's defeat at Tinah Khan on 3 January 1869. Both sought refuge to the east in Central Asia, where Abdur Rahman placed himself under Russian protection at Samarkand. Azam died in Kabul in October 1869.

Exile and negotiated return to power

Abdur Rahman lived in exile in Tashkent. He was one of the most powerful opponents of the British. He was being told to cross the Oxus and claim throne for Amir.  In March 1880, a report reached India that Abdur Rahman was in northern Afghanistan; and the Governor-General, Lord Lytton, opened communications with him to the effect that the British government were prepared to withdraw their troops, and to recognize Abdur Rahman as Amir of Afghanistan, except Kandahar and some districts adjacent to it. After some negotiations, and an interview with Lepel Griffin, the diplomatic representative at Kabul of the Indian government.  Griffin described Abdur Rahman as a man of middle height, with an exceedingly intelligent face and frank and courteous manners, shrewd and able in conversation on the business in hand.

Reign
At the durbar on 22 July 1880, Abdur Rahman was officially recognized as Amir, granted assistance in arms and money, and promised, in case of unprovoked foreign aggression, such further aid as might be necessary to repel it, provided that he align his foreign policy with the British. The British evacuation of Afghanistan was settled on the terms proposed, and in 1881, the British troops also handed over Kandahar to the new Amir.

However, Ayub Khan, one of Sher Ali Khan's sons, marched upon that city from Herat, defeated Abdur Rahman's troops, and occupied the place in July 1880. This serious reverse roused the Amir, who had not displayed much activity. Instead, Ayub Khan was defeated in Kandahar by the British General Frederick Roberts on 1 September 1880. Ayub Khan was forced to flee into Persia. From that time Abdur Rahman was fairly seated firm on the throne at Kabul, thanks to the unwavering British protections in terms of giving large supplies of arms and money. In the course of the next few years, Abdul Rahman consolidated his grip over all Afghanistan, suppressing insurrection by a relentless and brutal use of his despotic authority. The powerful Ghilzai revolted against the severity of his measures several times. In that same year, Ayub Khan made a fruitless inroad from Persia.

In 1885, at the moment when the Amir was in conference with the British viceroy, Lord Dufferin, in India, the news came of a skirmish between Russian and Afghan troops at Panjdeh, over a disputed point in the demarcation of the northwestern frontier of Afghanistan. Abdur Rahman's attitude at this critical juncture is a good example of his political sagacity. To one who had been a man of war from his youth, who had won and lost many fights, the rout of a detachment and the forcible seizure of some debatable frontier lands was an untoward incident; but it was not a sufficient reason for calling upon the British, although they had guaranteed his territory's integrity, to vindicate his rights by hostilities which would certainly bring upon him a Russian invasion from the north, and would compel his British allies to throw an army into Afghanistan from the southeast. He also published his autobiography in 1885, which served more as an advice guide for princes than anything else.

His interest lay in keeping powerful neighbours, whether friends or foes, outside his kingdom. He knew this to be the only policy that would be supported by the Afghan nation; and although for some time a rupture with Russia seemed imminent, while the Government of India made ready for that contingency, the Amir's reserved and circumspect tone in the consultations with him helped to turn the balance between peace and war, and substantially conduced towards a pacific solution. Abdur Rahman left on those who met him in India the impression of a clear-headed man of action, with great self-reliance and hardihood, not without indications of the implacable severity that too often marked his administration. His investment with the insignia of the highest grade of the Order of the Star of India appeared to give him much pleasure.

His adventurous life, his forcible character, the position of his state as a barrier between the Indian and the Russian empires, and the skill with which he held the balance in dealing with them, combined to make him a prominent figure in contemporary Asian politics and will mark his reign as an epoch in the history of Afghanistan. The Amir received an annual subsidy from the British government of 1,850,000 rupees. He was allowed to import munitions of war. He succeeded in imposing an organized government upon the fiercest and most unruly population in Asia; he availed himself of European inventions for strengthening his armament, while he sternly set his face against all innovations which, like railways and telegraphs, might give Europeans a foothold within his country.

He also built himself several summer and guest houses, including the Bagh-e Bala Palace and Chihil Sutun Palace in Kabul, and the Jahan Nama Palace in Kholm.

The Amir found himself unable, by reason of ill-health, to accept an invitation from Queen Victoria to visit England; but his second son Nasrullah Khan, the crown prince, went instead.

Durand Line

In 1893, Mortimer Durand was deputed to Kabul by the government of British India for this purpose of settling an exchange of territory required by the demarcation of the boundary between northeastern Afghanistan and the Russian possessions, and in order to discuss with  Amir Abdur Rahman Khan other pending questions. Abdur Rahman Khan showed his usual ability in diplomatic argument, his tenacity where his own views or claims were in debate, with a sure underlying insight into the real situation.

In the agreement that followed relations between the British Indian and Afghan governments, as previously arranged, were confirmed; and an understanding was reached upon the important and difficult subject of the border line of Afghanistan on the east, towards India. A Royal Commission was set up to determine the boundary between Afghanistan and British-governed India, and was tasked to negotiate terms for agreeing to the Durand Line, between the two parties camped at Parachinar, now part of FATA Pakistan, which is near Khost, Afghanistan. From the British side the camp was attended by Mortimer Durand and Sahibzada Abdul Qayyum, British Political Agent in Khyber. Afghanistan was represented by Sahibzada Abdul Latif and the Governor Sardar Shireendil Khan representing Amir Abdur Rahman Khan.

In 1893, Mortimer Durand negotiated with Abdur Rahman Khan the Durand Line Treaty for the demarcation of the frontier between Afghanistan, the FATA, North-West Frontier Province and Baluchistan, now provinces of Pakistan as a successor state of British India. In 1905, Amir Habibullah Khan signed a new agreement with the United Kingdom which confirmed the legality of the Durand Line. Similarly, the legality of the Durand Line was once again confirmed by King Amanullah Khan through the Treaty of Rawalpindi in 1919.

The Durand Line was once again recognised as international border between Pakistan and Afghanistan by Sardar Mohammed Daoud Khan (former prime minister and later president of Afghanistan) during his visit to Pakistan in August 1976.

Dictatorship and the "Iron Amir"

Abdur Rahman Khan's government was a military despotism resting upon a well-appointed army; it was administered through officials absolutely subservient to an inflexible will and controlled by a widespread system of espionage; while the exercise of his personal authority was too often stained by acts of unnecessary cruelty. He held open courts for the receipt of petitioners and the dispensation of justice; and in the disposal of business he was indefatigable.

In the 1880s, the "Iron Emir" decided to strategically displace some members of different ethnic groups in order to bring better security. For example, he "uprooted troublesome Durrani and Ghilzai Pashtun tribes and transported them to Uzbek and Tajik populated areas in the north, where they could spy on local Dari-speaking, non-Pashtun ethnic groups and act as a screen against further Russian encroachments on Afghan territory." From the end of 1888, the Amir spent eighteen months in his northern provinces bordering upon the Oxus, where he was engaged in pacifying the country that had been disturbed by revolts, and in punishing with a heavy hand all who were known or suspected to have taken any part in rebellion.

In 1895–1896, Abdur Rahman directed the invasion of Kafiristan and the conversion of its indigenous peoples to Islam. The region was subsequently renamed Nuristan.  In 1896, he adopted the title of Zia-ul-Millat-Wa-ud Din ("Light of the nation and religion"), and his zeal for the cause of Islam induced him to publish treatises on jihad.

Chitral, Yarkand and Ferghana became shelters for refugees in 1887 and 1883 from Badakhshan who fled from the campaigns of Abdul Rahman.

Hazara uprising

In the early 1890s some Hazara tribes revolted against Abdur Rahman. As the Kabul Newsletters written by the British agents indicate, Abdur Rahman was an extremely ruthless man. He has been called 'The Dracula Amir' by some writers. Due to Abdur Rahman's depredations, Over sixty percent of the total Hazara population was massacred and numerous towers of Hazara heads were made from the defeated rebels. It caused some Hazaras to migrate to Quetta in Balochistan, and to Mashhad in northeastern Iran.

Death and descendants

Abdur Rahman died on 1 October 1901, inside his summer palace, being succeeded by his son Habibullah Khan who is the father of Amanullah Khan.

Today, his descendants can be found in many places outside Afghanistan, such as in America, France, Germany, and even in Scandinavian countries such as Denmark. His two eldest sons, Habibullah Khan and Nasrullah Khan, were born at Samarkand. His youngest son, Mahomed Omar Jan, was born in 1889 of an Afghan mother, connected by descent with the Barakzai family. One of the Amir’s grandchildren, Azizullah Khan Ziai was the ambassador of Iran from 1930-1932, he was the son of Nasrullah Khan.

One of the Amir’s most notable descendants is Prince Ali Seraj.

Legacy
Afghan society has mixed feelings about his rule. A majority of Pashtuns (his native ethnics) remember him as a ruler who initiated many programs for modernization, and effectively prevented the country from being occupied by Russia by using the "financial and advisory" support of British Empire during the Great Game. The Emir was effectively dependent on British arms and money to stay in power.

Honours and awards
 Honorary Grand Commander of the Most Exalted Order of the Star of India, 11 April 1885
 Honorary Grand Cross of the Most Honourable Order of the Bath (civil division), 29 December 1893

Writings
 Pandnamah-i dunya va din (Advice on the worldly life and religion), 1883. Autobiography.
 Risalah-i Khirad’namah-i Amiri (Epistle of princely wisdom), 1886. On the notion of aql or intellect in Islam.
 Risalah-i najiyah, 1889. On the importance of jihad in the Qur’an and hadith.
 Taj al-Tavarikh (Crown of histories), 1904, Autobiography in 2 volumes.

In popular culture
 In the film Kesari, Abdur Rahman is briefly mentioned.

See also

European influence in Afghanistan
Lillias Hamilton (court physician to Abdur Rahman Khan in the 1890s)
List of heads of state of Afghanistan
Pashtun colonization of northern Afghanistan

Notes

References

Further reading
 Embree, Ainslie T. ed. Encyclopedia of Asian history (4 vol. 1988) 1:5.

External links

1844 births
1901 deaths
19th-century Afghan monarchs
20th-century Afghan monarchs
Emirs of Afghanistan
Barakzai dynasty
Durand Line
Pashtun people
Honorary Knights Grand Commander of the Order of the Star of India
Honorary Knights Grand Cross of the Order of the Bath
19th-century Afghan politicians
19th-century monarchs in Asia
20th-century Afghan politicians
Genocide perpetrators